Atari ST User was a British computer magazine aimed at users of the Atari ST range. It started life as a pull-out section in Atari User magazine. From March 1986 onwards it became a magazine in its own right, outliving its parent by a number of years. It was published by Europress in London.

Although ST User did review games and carry demos, far more of the magazine was concerned with 'serious' issues such as hardware, programming, and music than its rivals ST Action and ST Format.

The Cover Disk that was supplied with issue 59, cover dated January 1991 had a boot sector computer virus which infected the memory of the Atari ST and was written to other disks that were not write-protected.  Issue 60 had a free games cover disk as an apology, and was supplied with a virus killer. Source is http://www.atarimania.com/mags/hi_res/atari-st-user-issue-059_5.jpg

Towards the end of its print run, ST User merged with the game-oriented magazine ST Action, and publication finally ceased in November 1994, leaving ST Format as the only surviving Atari ST publication that was still widely available.

References

External links
Archived Atari ST User magazines on the Internet Archive

Atari ST magazines
Defunct computer magazines published in the United Kingdom
Magazines established in 1986
Magazines disestablished in 1994
Magazines published in London
Monthly magazines published in the United Kingdom